The Battle of Bud Dajo may refer to:

The First Battle of Bud Dajo, which occurred March 5–March 7, 1906, at Bud Dajo, Jolo Island, Philippines
The Second Battle of Bud Dajo, which occurred in December, 1911, at Bud Dajo, Jolo Island, Philippines